Barbie Fashion Designer is a dress-up computer game developed by Digital Domain and published by Mattel Media for Microsoft Windows and Mac OS in 1996. The game allows players to design clothing and style outfits. Players can then print off their designs and create clothing for their real-world Barbie dolls. Barbie Fashion Designer was the first commercially successful video game made for girls. After its success, many other girl games would be made, leading to the girls' games movement.

Gameplay 
Players can design clothing and outfits through selecting different themes, clothing, colors, and patterns from various menus. Once players have designed their outfit, Barbie models their outfit on a 3D runway. The software also came with special paper-backed fabric, markers, and fabric paint so that the designs could be printed off and made into clothes for real-life Barbie dolls. The game complemented the way young girls already liked to play with their Barbie dolls and this has been said to have led to its success.

Release and reception 
Barbie Fashion Designer was the ninth best-selling PC game of 1996 in the United States, with 393,575 CD-ROM units sold and $14,044,994 sales revenue. Barbie Fashion Designer went on to sell over 500,000 copies in its first two months of release and over 600,000 within the first year of its release, outselling other popular games at the time such as Quake and Doom. According to PC Data, which tracked computer game sales in the United States, Fashion Designer sold 351,945 units and earned $14 million by the end of 1996. It was the country's sixth-best-selling computer game of that year. Commenting on its performance that year, a writer for Next Generation wrote that "Barbie Fashion Designer has done an excellent job at expanding the market and scored well with the female population." It was also the top-selling SKU for Christmas 1997. According to Joyce Slaton of GameSpot, "Mattel's successful innovation [was] placing Barbie Fashion Designer on toy aisles rather than in the boy-dominated software section in toy stores".

Despite this success, the game has received criticism for using stereotypical feminine themes. Purple Moon founder Brenda Laurel has said the game “…perpetuated a version of femininity that was fundamentally lame”. However, its commercial success made it a catalyst for the girls' games movement and proved there was a market for video games designed for young girls.

Jan Davidson of Davidson & Associates said of the game, "It's interesting how that product sold more in a shorter time than any other product in history, including the best selling games! And it's just a niche for girls (there aren't too many little boys playing with that title, I don't think). So that tells you something. It was an incredible hit from a sales perspective. It also tells us how licensed characters can sell product."

References

External links

Barbie video games
1996 video games
Software for children
Video games featuring female protagonists
Children's educational video games
Windows games
Classic Mac OS games
Video games developed in the United States